is a Japanese sprint canoer who competed in the mid-1960s. At the 1964 Summer Olympics in Tokyo, he was eliminated in the repechages of the K-2 1000 m event.

External links
Sports-reference.com profile

1942 births
Canoeists at the 1964 Summer Olympics
Japanese male canoeists
Living people
Olympic canoeists of Japan